Uzunoba may refer to:
 Argavand, Armavir, Armenia
Uzunoba, Aghjabadi, Azerbaijan
Uzunoba, Khachmaz, Azerbaijan
Aşağı Uzunoba, Azerbaijan
Yuxarı Uzunoba, Azerbaijan